Iván Garrido González (born 2 February 1990) is a Spanish professional footballer who plays as a defender for Indian Super League club East Bengal.

Club career
Born in Parla, Madrid, Garrido joined Real Madrid's youth setup in 2002 at the age of 12, from locals AD Parla. He made his senior debut with the C-team in the 2008–09 season, in Tercera División.

On 29 July 2012 Garrido moved to another reserve team, Deportivo de La Coruña B also in the fourth tier. On 12 August of the following year he signed for Segunda División B club UB Conquense, being a regular starter for both sides.

On 23 July 2014 Garrido joined fellow third division club Cultural Leonesa. After a one-year spell at Racing de Ferrol he returned to the club, and contributed with 39 matches (play-offs included) as his side achieved promotion to Segunda División after 42 years.

Garrido made his professional debut on 18 August 2017, starting in a 0–2 away loss against Lorca FC.

FC Goa
In 2020, Garrido signed with Indian Super League side FC Goa on a two-year deal. He then appeared in the 2021 AFC Champions League group stage matches for Goa.

In 2021, he appeared with Goa at the 130th edition of Durand Cup and reached to the final, defeating Bengaluru FC 7–6 in sudden death. On 3 October, FC Goa clinched their first ever Durand Cup title defeating Mohammedan SC 1–0.

East Bengal
In August 2022, González was announced as one of the five foreigners signed by East Bengal for the upcoming season, on a two-year deal.

On 25 August, he made his debut against Rajasthan United in the Durand Cup, which ended in a 0–0 stalemate. He came on as a half-time substitute for Charalambos Kyriakou.

Club statistics

Club

Honours
Cultural Leonesa
Segunda División B: 2016–17

Goa
Durand Cup: 2021

References

External links

1990 births
Living people
People from Parla
Spanish footballers
Footballers from the Community of Madrid
Association football defenders
Segunda División players
Segunda División B players
Tercera División players
Real Madrid C footballers
UB Conquense footballers
Cultural Leonesa footballers
Racing de Ferrol footballers
FC Goa players
Indian Super League players